Sinfest is a long-running American webcomic by Tatsuya Ishida. Updating daily, Sinfest started as a black comedy strip in January 2000. It covers such topics as American politics, organized religion, and  radical feminism.

Overview
It follows the characters of Slick, Monique, and pig person Squigley. Supporting characters include religious figures such as God, the Devil, Buddha, and Jesus, as well as personifications of Time and the United States.

Sinfest originated as a four-panel comedy strip relying on dark humor with frequent pop culture references. It evolved into a more serious work covering such issue as American exceptionalism., slut-shaming, misogyny, and street harassment. Wired.com stated that Sinfest "takes a very irreverent view of organized religion".

Ishida uploads a new black and white strip of Sinfest every day of the week, and publishes a larger, full-color page every Sunday.

Development
In an interview with Publishers Weekly, Ishida stated that he knew he wanted to become a comics author ever since he read a Peanuts paperback as a child. "[S]omething about the simplicity and solitary nature of the medium appealed to me." Ishida briefly served as penciller for Dark Horse Comics' G.I. Joe Extreme in the early 1990s. Ishida said that he botched this job, noting that "several [of his] pages were so poorly drawn they had to get another guy to redo them entirely". Later on this decade, Ishida attempted to work in animation, but this path also did not pan out. In 2000, Ishida taught himself HTML, put together a Geocities web page, and started uploading Sinfest strips seven days per week. Ishida stated that he managed to sustain this strict schedule during the first seven years purely through "coffee and revenge".

Ishida views his older works as an indicator of his emotional state during this period, describing his early Sinfest strips as "unhinged, totally off the chain".  In 2009, Ishida claimed his strip was "still pretty wild, but there's also more warmth, more tenderness", citing 2005 as a turning point. During the 2008 United States Presidential Election, Sinfest became much more politics-heavy. This was in part because of the "collective anxiety" regarding the Financial crisis of 2007–2008 and the magnitude of the $700 billion emergency bailout proposed by the United States Congress. Ishida stated that he switches between characters and situations in his webcomic "pretty much on a whim", claiming that the longer storylines of his webcomic help to tie it all together. In 2011, Ishida started to produce colored strips as well, giving readers "something extra fun and engaging" on Sundays. Ishida remains rather private and interacts little with his readership.

Ishida self-published three volumes of Sinfest in print between 2002 and 2005. Two volumes of Sinfest have been published in print by Dark Horse Comics. The first of these was released in mid-2009 and reprints the entire first year of the webcomic. The second volume, titled Viva la Resistance, covers the webcomic's run from 2003 to 2004, featuring over 600 pages that were previously uncollected. Sinfest has also appeared in the Norwegian comic magazine Nemi.

Reception
PC Magazine listed Sinfest among the best webcomics of 2015. Sinfest has been nominated for various Web Cartoonists' Choice Awards.

On December 7th, 2022, Patreon banned Ishida Tatsuya for allegedly promoting "sentiments of discrimination based on gender identity or sexual orientation."

References

American webcomics
2000s webcomics
Webcomics in print
American comedy webcomics
Satirical webcomics
Short form webcomics
Web Cartoonists' Choice Award winners
Fantasy webcomics
2000 webcomic debuts
Feminist webcomics